Andras Horvath (born April 8, 1976) is a Hungarian former professional ice hockey defenceman. He played for Dunaújvárosi Acélbikák, Újpesti TE, Alba Volán Székesfehérvár and Ferencvárosi TC (ice hockey).

Horvath played in the 2009 IIHF World Championship for the Hungary national team.

Career statistics

Austrian Hockey League

References

External links

1976 births
Dunaújvárosi Acélbikák players
Ferencvárosi TC (ice hockey) players
Hungarian ice hockey defencemen
Living people
Ice hockey people from Budapest
Fehérvár AV19 players
Újpesti TE (ice hockey) players